The anime series Blue Exorcist is based on the manga series of the same title by Kazue Kato. It is directed by Tensai Okamura and produced by A-1 Pictures. The series follows a teenager named Rin Okumura who finds out he is the son of Satan and is determined to become an exorcist in order to defeat him after the death of his guardian, Father Fujimoto.

Blue Exorcist began broadcasting in Japan on the Mainichi Broadcasting System and the Tokyo Broadcasting System on April 17, 2011, the anime then ended on October 2, 2011. The series was originally scheduled to start airing on April 10, 2011, however due to the 2011 Tōhoku earthquake and tsunami, the series' initial broadcast was delayed by a week. The episodes are being simulcasted with English subtitles online via Hulu, Anime News Network, and Crunchyroll, starting on April 20, 2011. and Aniplex of America release Blue Exorcist on DVD in four sets, starting by releasing the first DVD on October 18, 2011.

Blue Exorcist began broadcasting in the United States and Canada on Viz Media's online network, Neon Alley, on October 2, 2012, and aired on Adult Swim's Toonami from February 22, 2014, to August 9, 2014.

A sequel anime, titled Blue Exorcist: Kyoto Saga, premiered on January 7, 2017.



Series overview

Episode list

Season 1 (2011)

Season 2: Kyoto Saga (2017)

References

External links
 Official Website 

Blue Exorcist episode lists
Lists of anime episodes